The Secret of Kells is a 2009 animated fantasy film about the making of the Book of Kells, an illuminated manuscript from the 9th Century.

The film is an Irish-French-Belgian co-production animated by Cartoon Saloon, which premiered on 8 February 2009 at the 59th Berlin International Film Festival. It went into wide release in Belgium and France on 11 February, and Ireland on 3 March. It was nominated for the Academy Award for Best Animated Feature, but lost to Pixar's Up.

It was directed by Tomm Moore and Nora Twomey, produced by Paul Young, Didier Brunner and Vivian Van Fleteren, written by Fabrice Ziolkowski, distributed by Gébéka Films, Kinepolis Film Distribution, Buena Vista International, edited by Fabienne Alvarez-Giro and music composed by Bruno Coulais and Kíla. It stars Evan McGuire, Brendan Gleeson, Christen Mooney, Mick Lally (in his final film role), Michael McGrath, Liam Hourican, Paul Tylak and Paul Young. The film is the first installment in Moore's "Irish Folklore Trilogy", preceding the films Song of the Sea (2014) and Wolfwalkers (2020).

Plot
Set in 9th century Ireland, during the age of Viking expansion, the film’s protagonist is Brendan, a curious and brave boy living in the tightly-knit Abbey of Kells under the care of his stern uncle, Abbot Cellach, who is obsessed with building a wall around the Abbey to prevent Viking attacks.

Apprenticed in the scriptorium of the monastery, Brendan hears the other monks talk of Brother Aidan, creator of the Book of Iona, and becomes curious about the mysterious illuminator and the book that "turns darkness into light" (the unfinished Book of Kells). Aidan arrives in Kells, accompanied by his white cat with heterochromatic eyes, Pangur Bán, after his monastery at Iona is destroyed by a raid. After eavesdropping on a discussion between Cellach and Aidan, Brendan wanders into the scriptorium and finds the still-to-be-completed book guarded by Pangur Bán. Aidan arrives, and tells Brendan about the book.

Seeing Brendan as a suitable apprentice, Aidan sends him and Pangur Bán into the woods to obtain gall nuts to make ink. Cornered by a hungry pack of wolves, Brendan is saved by the fairy Aisling, who overcomes her initial suspicion and accepts Brendan after he reveals his intentions of helping to create the book.

After a close encounter with Crom Cruach, a deity of death and destruction of whom Aisling is deeply afraid, Brendan and Aisling return to the outskirts of the forest, and she assures him that he can return any time.

At the monastery, Brendan is reprimanded by Cellach, who forbids him to leave again. Continuing to work with Aidan, Brendan learns that the work is endangered by the loss of the ‘Eye of Colm Cille’, a special magnifying lens captured from Crom Cruach. When Brendan tries to visit Crom's cave to obtain another ‘Eye’, Cellach confines him to his room.

Freed by Pangur Bán and Aisling, Brendan runs into the heart of the woods, where a shocked Aisling begs him not to confront the dark deity, warning that Crom Cruach will kill him just as it killed her mother and the rest of her people. Declaring that the book will never be completed without the ‘Eye’, Brendan persuades Aisling to help him enter Crom’s cave, narrowly escaping death in the process. Brendan duels with Crom and seizes the Eye, blinding Crom and causing the deity to consume itself, becoming an ouroboros. Returning to the cave entrance, Brendan finds the forest covered in white flowers.

Brendan returns to the abbey and continues to assist Aidan in secret, watched excitedly by the brothers of the monastery. A messenger from outside warns Cellach that the Vikings are on their way. In a fit of anger and frustration, Cellach locks Brendan and Aidan in the scriptorium, but not before ripping out a page Brendan had created. The Vikings invade Kells and breach the wooden gate, to Cellach’s horror. Cellach is wounded by an arrow, then by a Viking blade, as the Vikings swarm Kells. Still locked in the burning scriptorium, Brendan and Aidan escape using green smoke from the gallberry ink, confusing the raiders. The wooden staircase to the abbey’s central tower becomes overloaded with panicked villagers and collapses, and the village and abbey below are set ablaze.

Unable to help Cellach, Brendan and Aidan flee to the forest with Pangur Bán as the Vikings breach the main church and attack the monks and villagers hiding within. Vikings in the forest find Brendan and Aidan and take the bejeweled cover, scattering the pages of the book, but Aisling’s wolves arrive and either scare away or kill the Vikings. As Brendan finds the final page of the book, he comes face to face for a moment with a white wolf, who may be Aisling.

Kells has been sacked and burnt, with few survivors, and Cellach severely injured (although he survives). Brendan and Aidan travel across Ireland and, after many years, complete the book. Aidan entrusts the book to Brendan and then dies, and the now-adult Brendan returns to Kells with Pangur Bán, guided by a white wolf (revealed to be Aisling). Brendan reunites with the aged, guilt-ridden Cellach, and shows him the completed Book of Kells. The film closes with an animated rendition of the Chi-Rho page, featuring its intense detail.

Cast
 Evan McGuire as Brendan, a bright, imaginative, and curious 12-year-old who leads a sheltered life. 
 Brendan Gleeson as Abbot Cellach, Brendan's uncle, who is a former illuminator who now superintends a wall to protect the Abbey of Kells from invasion.
 Christen Mooney as Aisling, a forest fairy, related to the Tuatha Dé Danann, living in the woods outside of Kells. 
 Mick Lally as Brother Aidan, a master illuminator. This was noted to be Lally’s last film before his death on 31 August 2010.
 Michael McGrath as Adult Brendan.
 Liam Hourican as Brothers Tang and Leonardo, two illuminators from Asia and Italy, respectively. 
 Paul Tylak as Brother Assoua, an illuminator from Africa. 
 Paul Young as Brother Square, an illuminator from England.

Influences

The film is based on the story of the origin of the Book of Kells, an illuminated manuscript Gospel book in Latin, containing the four Gospels of the New Testament located in Dublin, Ireland. It also draws upon Celtic mythology; examples include its inclusion of Crom Cruach, a pre-Christian Irish deity and the reference to the poetic genre of Aislings, in which a poet is confronted by a dream or vision of a seeress, in the naming of the forest sprite encountered by Brendan. Wider mythological similarities have also been commented upon, such as parallels between Brendan's metaphysical battle with Crom Cruach and Beowulf's underwater encounter with Grendel's mother. The Secret of Kells began development in 1999, when Tomm Moore and several of his friends were inspired by Richard Williams's The Thief and the Cobbler, Disney's Mulan, Gustav Klimt's paintings, John Bauer's illustrations and the works of Hayao Miyazaki, which based their visual style on the respective traditional art of the cultures featured in each film. They decided to do something similar to Studio Ghibli's films but with Irish art. Tomm Moore explained that the visual style was inspired by Celtic and medieval art, being 'flat, with false perspective and lots of colour'. Even the cleanup was planned to 'obtain the stained-glass effect of thicker outer lines'.

Reception
The film was very well received by critics. On Rotten Tomatoes it has an approval rating of 90% based on 84 reviews, with an average rating of 7.6/10. Rotten Tomatoes critics concluded that the film was "Beautifully drawn and refreshingly calm, The Secret of Kells hearkens back to animation's golden age with an enchanting tale inspired by Irish mythology." On Metacritic, the film has a weighted average score of 81 out of 100, based on 20 reviews, indicating "universal acclaim".

Some critics compared the film to Hayao Miyazaki's works such as Princess Mononoke and Spirited Away. Joe Morgenstern of the Wall Street Journal said that "it pays homage to Celtic culture and design, together with techniques and motifs that evoke Matisse, Miyazaki and the minimalist cartoons of UPA".

Gary Thompson of the Philadelphia Daily News said The Secret of Kells "is noteworthy for its unique, ornate design, its moments of silence... and gorgeous music". Leslie Felperin of Variety Magazine praised the film as "Refreshingly different" and "absolutely luscious to behold". Jeremy W. Kaufmann of Ain't It Cool News called its animation "absolutely brilliant", and reviewers at Starlog called it "one of the greatest hand drawn independent animated movies of all time". Writing for the Los Angeles Times, Charles Solomon ranked the film the tenth best anime on his "Top 10". On Oscar weekend it was released at the IFC Center in New York City and was then released in other venues and cities in the United States, where it grossed $667,441.

According to Paul Young, CEO of Cartoon Saloon, "Kells came out and it didn’t really make much of an impact in Ireland... It made more waves in the US. It got picked up by GKIDS Films, which was the first time they had theatrically distributed a movie".

Accolades
Wins
 2008: Directors Finders Award at the Directors Finders Series in Ireland
 2009: Audience Award at the Annecy International Animation Film Festival
 2009: Audience Award at the Edinburgh International Film Festival
 2009: Roy E. Disney Award at Seattle's 2D Or Not 2D Film Festival
 2009: Grand Prize at the Seoul International Cartoon and Animation Festival
 2009: Audience Award at the 9th Kecskemét Animation Film Festival; Kecskemét City Prize at the 6th Festival of European Animated Feature Films and TV Specials
 2010: Best Animation award at the 7th Irish Film and Television Awards
 2010: European Animated Feature Award at the British Animation Awards

Nominations
 2009: Grand Prix Award for Best Film in the Annecy International Animation Film Festival
 2009: Best Animated Film at the 22nd European Film Awards
 2009: Best Animated Feature at the 37th Annie Awards
 2010: Best Film at the 7th Irish Film and Television Awards
 2010: Best Animated Feature at the 82nd Academy Awards

See also
 List of animated feature-length films
 Book of Kells
 Cartoon Saloon
 Iona

References

Literature 
 Keazor, Henry, "Stil, Symbol, Struktur: 'The Tree of Life' als Motiv im Film", in: Der achte Tag. Naturbilder in der Kunst des 21. Jahrhunderts, edited by Frank Fehrenbach and Matthias Krüger, Berlin/Boston 2016, p. 163 - 200

External links
 
 
 
 

2000s children's animated films
2000s children's fantasy films
2000s fantasy adventure films
2000s French animated films
2009 animated films
2009 independent films
Animated adventure films
Animated films based on Celtic mythology
Anime-influenced Western animation
Belgian animated films
Belgian independent films
Canal+ films
Cartoon Saloon films
English-language Belgian films
English-language French films
English-language Irish films
Films about Catholicism
Films about Christianity
Films about fairies and sprites
Films directed by Tomm Moore
Films scored by Bruno Coulais
Films set in the 9th century
Films set in Ireland
Films set in the Viking Age
France 2 Cinéma films
French animated feature films
French fantasy adventure films
French independent films
Historical fantasy films
Irish animated films
Irish children's films
Irish Film Board films
Irish independent films
Saint Patrick's Day fiction